Nicodemus is a masculine given name of Greek origin meaning “victory of the people.” Nicodemus is a Biblical figure. Nikodem, a Croatian and Polish version of the name, was among the most popular names for newborn boys in Poland in 2022.

Versions in different languages
Different versions of the name are in use in countries all over the world. Niqudimus is the Arabic version; Nikadzim is the Belarusian version; Nicodem is the Catalan version; Ní gē dǐ mǔ is the Chinese version; Nicodème is the French version of the name; Nikodemos is the Finnish and Swedish version; Nikódimos is the Greek version of the name; Nikodemus is the Danish, Dutch, German, Indonesian, and Norwegian version; Nikodémosz is the Hungarian version; Nicodemo is the Italian, Portuguese, and Spanish version; Nikodemo is the Basque, Esperanto, Japanese,  and Kiswahili version; Nigodemo is the Korean version; Nicodim is the Romanian version; Nikodim is the Russian and Serbian version; Nikkatēm is the Tamil version; Nykodym is the Ukrainian version.

People
Nicodemus (Krotkov) (1868–1938), Russian Orthodox Archbishop of Kostroma and Galich
Nicodemus (musician) (1957–1996), Jamaican dancehall deejay
Nicodemus (Rusnak) (1921–2011), Ukrainian Orthodox metropolitan bishop of Kharkiv and Bohodukhiv
Nicodemus of Mammola (900–990), Italian hermit and saint
Nicodemus of Palermo (died 1083), bishop
Saint Nikodim I, Serbian Archbishop, 1316–1324
Nikodim II, Serbian Patriarch (c. 1445-1455)
Nicodème Audet (1822–1905), Canadian merchant and politician
Philipp Nicodemus Frischlin (1547–1590), German scholar
Nicodemus the Hagiorite (1749–1809), saint
Nikodim Kondakov (1844–1925), Russian historian
Metropolitan Nikodim (Rotov) of Leningrad (1929–1978)
Nikodimos Papavasiliou (born 1970), Cypriot manager and former footballer
Nicodemo Scarfo (1929–2017), Italian American mafioso
Nicodemus Tessin the Younger (1654–1728), Swedish architect and city planner
Nicodemus Tessin the Elder (1615–1681), Swedish architect
Nikodim Tsarknias (born 1942), Macedonian monk
Fred Nicodemus, a physicist, author of the bidirectional reflectance distribution function

Apocryphal Gospel
Gospel of Nicodemus, a fourth century CE Apocryphal Gospel, claimed to be derived from a work by Nicodemus from St. John's Gospel

Fictional characters
Nicodemus, a wise rat who helps the title character in the book Mrs. Frisby and the Rats of NIMH and in the 1982 animated film adaptation The Secret of NIMH
Nicodemus, Robin Williams' character's dog in the License to Wed
Nicodemus, a villain in Batman
Nicodemus Archleone, a villain in The Dresden Files
Nicodemus, father of Empress Eartia in the American comic book Atarian Conquest
Nicodemus Boffin, nouveau riche character in Charles Dickens' Our Mutual Friend
Nicodemus Dumps, misanthropic character in Charles Dickens' Sketches by Boz tale the Bloomsbury Christening
Nicodemus Legend, the protagonist in the television series Legend
Nicodemus, the deputy of the sheriff (Gospel Bill) in the Christian children's show The Gospel Bill Show

Notes

English masculine given names